Adult adoption is a form of adoption between two or more adults in order to transfer inheritance rights and/or filiation.  Adult adoption may be done for various reasons including:  to establish intestate inheritance rights; to formalize a step-parent/step-child relationship or a foster parent/foster child relationship; or to restore the original legal relationship between adult adoptees and their biological families.

In Japan, adult adoption may be used in order to facilitate the continuance of a family business. This form of adoption is known as mukoyōshi ("son-in-law adoption"). Adult adoption may also be used in some jurisdictions by same-sex couples in order to establish inheritance rights.

Depending on the laws of the jurisdiction, adult adoption may not be available as a legal option.  In the United Kingdom, only children may be adopted.  The Adoption and Children Act (2002) states, "An application for an adoption order may only be made if the person to be adopted has not attained the age of 18 years on the date of the application."

In places where adult adoptions exist, it may or may not transfer filiation in addition to inheritance rights.  For example, in Colorado, one can adopt an adult of age 21 or older for inheritance purposes, but filiation will remain unaffected. However, adoption of a person between the ages of 18 and 20 (inclusive) transfers both inheritance rights and filiation.   In countries where same-sex couples have not received the same legal protections as heterosexual couples, adult adoption of a partner has been used to ensure the property transfer to the surviving partner upon death.

Among same-sex couples

During 80s and 90s, in absence of recognition of same-sex marriage, adult adoption was a way used by some persons having same-sex preference to let their partner inherit their estates. The process however involved the convoluted process of first getting rid of the formal parent child relationship of the adoptee from his/her biological parents and then applying for an adult adoption where his/her partner would be the adopter. In the 2010 book Equality for Same-Sex Couples: The Legal Recognition of Gay Partnerships in Europe and the United States, author Yuval Merin called adult adoption among same-sex couples "problematic" and noted that it had not gained popularity as a means to "circumvent the impossibility of same-sex marriage" at that time in the U.S.

See also
Japanese adult adoption
Same-sex adult adoption

References

 
Kinship and descent
Adoption law